Gaoyang County is a county in the central part of Hebei province, People's Republic of China.

The county seat is in Gaoyang Town.

Administrative divisions
There are 4 towns and 5 townships under the county's administration.

Towns:
Gaoyang, Pangkou, Xiyan, Xingjianan

Townships:
Jinzhuang Township, Pukou Township, Xiaowangguozhuang Township, Longhua Township, Pangjiazhuang Township

Climate

Notable inhabitants
Liang Tsai-Ping, guzheng player
Qi Xin, author and member of the Chinese Communist Party, wife of Chinese communist revolutionary Xi Zhongxun and mother of Chinese Communist Party General Secretary and Chinese President Xi Jinping

References

External links

 
Geography of Baoding
County-level divisions of Hebei